The American Spectator is a conservative American magazine covering news and politics, edited by R. Emmett Tyrrell Jr. and published by the non-profit American Spectator Foundation. It was founded in 1967 by Tyrrell, who remains its editor-in-chief, with Wlady Pleszczynski its managing editor since 1980. 

From 1967 until the late 1980s, the magazine featured the writings of authors such as Thomas Sowell, Tom Wolfe, P. J. O'Rourke, George F. Will, Malcolm Gladwell, Patrick J. Buchanan, Tom Bethell, Terry Eastland, Andrew Ferguson, Christopher Caldwell, Fred Barnes, Roger Scruton, Walter Williams, Raymond Aron, Luigi Barzini, Paul Johnson, Irving Kristol, Jean-Francois Revel, and Malcolm Muggeridge. Major conservative writers and editors, such as Bill Kristol and Bill McGurn, began their careers at The American Spectator, as did Greg Gutfeld and John Podhoretz, who started at the magazine as interns. Some of the earliest published articles by prominent conservatives such as Dinesh D'Souza, Laura Ingraham, and David Frum appeared at The American Spectator. Among the magazine's longest-serving columnists are Sowell, Ben Stein, Roger Kaplan, and John Coyne. Current frequently contributing writers include David Catron, Dov Fischer, Daniel Flynn, Ross Kaminsky, Paul Kengor, Robert Stacy McCain, Scott McKay, George Neumayr, and George Parry. Ali Alexander has also contributed. 

During the 1990s, the magazine experienced explosive growth, primarily for its widely read and provocative reports on Bill Clinton and Hillary Clinton and its "Arkansas Project", funded by businessman Richard Mellon Scaife and the Bradley Foundation. The American Spectator has carried articles by Thomas Sowell, a regular column by economist and celebrity Ben Stein, as well as former Reagan aide Jeffrey Lord, conservative health care consultant David Catron, and editorial director Wladyslaw Pleszczynski, as well as occasional articles by P.J. O'Rourke.

Founding and history
The original name The American Spectator derives from a short-lived magazine by that name founded in 1924 by George Jean Nathan and Truman Newberry.  The origins of the current magazine date to its founding in Bloomington, Indiana by Tyrrell in 1967. That year, Tyrrell and his "Saturday Evening Club" took up the name, calling the magazine The Alternative: An American Spectator.

After operating under the name The Alternative: An American Spectator for several years, in 1977 the magazine changed its name to The American Spectator because, in editor Tyrrell's words, "the word 'alternative' had come to be associated almost exclusively with radicals and with their way of life."  In fact, Tyrrell had started the magazine on the campus of Indiana University Bloomington in 1967 as a conservative alternative to the student radicalism at the nation's universities in the 1960s. American Spectator is not affiliated with The Spectator, a British magazine of somewhat similar format and conservatism founded in 1828.

During the Reagan Administration, the magazine moved from Bloomington, Indiana to suburban Washington, D.C.

1990s 

The publication gained prominence in the 1990s by reporting on political scandals. The March 1992 issue contained David Brock's criticisms of Clarence Thomas accuser Anita Hill. Brock and his colleague Daniel Wattenberg soon aimed at a bigger target: Hillary and Bill Clinton.  A January 1994 article about then-President Bill Clinton's sex life contained the first reference in print to Clinton accuser Paula Jones, although the article focused on allegations that Clinton used Arkansas state troopers to facilitate his extramarital sexual activities (see Troopergate).  It only referred to Jones by her first name and corroborated few if any elements of her story. This article was the basis for the claim of damages in a sexual harassment lawsuit, which started the chain of events resulting in President Clinton's impeachment.

David Brock recanted his accusations upon his departure from the conservative movement. He also denounced his Anita Hill article in his 2003 book Blinded by the Right: the Conscience of an Ex-Conservative. He implies that Rush Limbaugh's coverage of his Anita Hill article instigated advertising on Limbaugh's network, which resulted in a large increase in the magazine's circulation. He also implies that this caused the magazine's content to move "away from thoughtful essays and scholarly reviews and humor pieces" to "hit jobs."

For his part, Wattenberg eventually incurred the displeasure of many fellow conservatives when he belatedly admitted that he had killed a story about rumors of Clinton fathering a child out of wedlock as a result of his relationship with a young African American woman. Wattenberg actually tracked down a videotape of the woman being interviewed by an unnamed third party who asked her what Wattenberg described as "softball" questions, but he never was able to interview her himself.  Wattenberg's rationales for killing the story were that he had no proof that the story was true and that the woman's testimony was unconvincing. He said that she "seemed like a junkie." The story was revived in 1999 by Matt Drudge.

Internal strife eventually led to the departure of long-time publisher Ronald Burr after a disagreement with Tyrrell led Burr to call for an independent audit of the magazine's finances. The departure of Burr and several prominent conservative figures from the magazine's board of directors resulted in conservative foundations pulling much of the funding the nonprofit had relied on to pay high salaries to Brock and Tyrrell, as well as to fund direct-mail campaigns needed to keep up the monthly's circulation. Faced with a budget crisis, the magazine, then led by publisher Terry Eastland, a former spokesman in the Reagan Justice Department, laid off staffers and cut spending significantly. The magazine also struggled to pay legal bills incurred from an investigation launched against it by the Justice Department for alleged witness tampering in the Whitewater investigation.  The Justice Department investigation led to revelations about the "Arkansas Project," a campaign by businessman Richard Mellon Scaife to discredit the Clintons by funding investigative reporting at several conservative media outlets.

2000s
As shortfalls continued, George Gilder, a longtime supporter of the magazine, who was newly wealthy from an Internet business, purchased the magazine with the goal of turning it into a profit-making glossy with significant media buzz.  Numerous staff members, demoralized by the ever-looming budget crises, were laid off or departed after Joshua Gilder and Richard Vigilante took the reins and vowed to reach a new technology- and business-savvy audience. Circulation and budget losses continued and even increased in the Gilder era, and at one point the entire Washington-based staff, other than Tyrrell and executive editor and web site editor Wladyslaw Pleszczynski, were laid off as operations were moved to Massachusetts, where the rest of George Gilder's businesses were based. In 2003, George Gilder, who had lost most of his fortune with the bursting of the Internet stock bubble, sold the magazine for $1 back to Tyrrell and the American Alternative Foundation, the magazine's original owner.  Later, the name of the owner was changed to the American Spectator Foundation. The magazine then moved operations back to the Washington, D.C. area. Later that year, former book publisher Alfred S. Regnery became the magazine's publisher. By 2004, circulation hovered at around 50,000.

2010s
In 2013, the magazine reverted to a tabloid format, reflecting the roots of the magazine, which was originally published at a large size. For most of the 1990s and all of the 2000s the Spectator had been published in a traditional magazine format.

In 2011, Assistant Editor Patrick Howley published a piece detailing his infiltration of a Washington, D.C. protest.  In the article, Howley asserts his aim to "mock and undermine" the protest against American Imperialism, and writes in the first person about his experiences protesting at the National Air and Space Museum. This article, and the methods detailed within, was condemned by The Guardian, The Atlantics "Atlantic Wire" blog, and The Economist, because they believed the correspondents who worked on the story had conflated journalism and politics Matt Steinglass of The Economist wrote that Howley "winds up offering a vision of politics as a kind of self-focused performance art, or perhaps (to say the same thing) a version of Jackass."

Online publication

The magazine's final monthly print publication was released in July/August 2014. While the American Spectator did issue a September/October PDF only version late in mid-November 2014, the masthead still claimed that it was "published monthly, except for combined July/Aug and Jan/Feb issues." A note from Editorial Director Wlady Pleszczynski admitted that "...we have some problems of our own." Wlady Pleszczynski added that the issue "was ready for release well over a month ago but for reasons affecting many a print publication these days couldn't be published on actual pages and after considerable delay is now being released in digital form only." After that online publications have become permanent and available.

The latest editions of the magazine:

 Summer 2021 Magazine "The Biden Economy"
 Winter 2020 Magazine "Liberty in Crisis"
 Summer 2020 Magazine "Make America Great - Yet Again"
 Fall 2019 Magazine "Technical Difficulties"

Return to print
The magazine returned to print in the fall of 2017 under the direction of Hannah Rowan. It is published in the winter and summer.

Core editorial staff
Editor in Chief: R. Emmett Tyrrell Jr.
Editorial Director: Wladyslaw Pleszczynski
Publisher: Melissa Mackenzie
Managing Editor: Hannah Rowan
Senior Editors: F. H. Buckley, Daniel J. Flynn, Paul Kengor, George Neumayr, Grover C. Norquist, Ben Stein
Contributing Editors: Jed Babbin, David Catron, Dov Fischer, Shmuel Klatzkin, Jeffrey Lord, Robert Stacy McCain, George Parry, Arnold Steinberg, Larry Thornberry

References

Further reading
David Brock, Blinded by the Right: The Conscience of an Ex-Conservative, Crown, 2002. 
R. Emmett Tyrrell, Jr. (ed.), Orthodoxy: The American Spectator's 20th Anniversary Anthology, Harper & Row, 1987.

External links

Conservative magazines published in the United States
Monthly magazines published in the United States
News magazines published in the United States
Online magazines published in the United States
Defunct political magazines published in the United States
Magazines established in 1924
Magazines disestablished in 2014
Magazines published in Virginia
New Right (United States)
Online magazines with defunct print editions